Katya is a genus of Southeast Asian jumping spiders first described by Jerzy Prószyński & Christa Deeleman-Reinhold in 2010.  it contains only three species. This genus is named after the Uzbek arachnologist Ekaterina Andreeva.

References

External links

Salticidae genera
Salticidae